Diego Emmanuel Acosta Curtido, known as Diego Acosta (born 12 November 2002) is a Paraguayan professional footballer who plays as a centre-forward for Russian club FC Orenburg.

Club career
After making his senior professional debut earlier in 2022 in the Russian second tier with FC KAMAZ Naberezhnye Chelny, on 10 July 2022 Acosta signed with Russian Premier League club FC Orenburg. He made his RPL debut for Orenburg on 28 August 2022 in a game against FC Lokomotiv Moscow.

International career
Acosta represented Paraguay at the 2019 FIFA U-17 World Cup, where they reached the quarter-finals.

Career statistics

References

External links
 
 

2002 births
Living people
Paraguayan footballers
Paraguay youth international footballers
Association football forwards
FC KAMAZ Naberezhnye Chelny players
FC Orenburg players
Russian First League players
Russian Premier League players
Paraguayan expatriate footballers
Expatriate footballers in Brazil
Paraguayan expatriate sportspeople in Brazil
Expatriate footballers in Russia
Paraguayan expatriate sportspeople in Russia